Bojan Kostreš (born August 25, 1974) is a Serbian politician who is the current president and former vice-president of the League of Social Democrats of Vojvodina. He held office as the president of the Assembly of Vojvodina between October 2004 and July 2008.

References 

1974 births
Living people
Presidents of the Assembly of Vojvodina
Members of the Assembly of Vojvodina
Politicians from Zrenjanin
League of Social Democrats of Vojvodina politicians